Nivola is a literary genre invented by Spanish author Miguel de Unamuno.

Nivola may also refer to:
 Rito della Nivola, a Catholic rite and historical reenactment held in Milan, Italy
 Alessandro Nivola (born 1972), an American actor
 Costantino Nivola (1911–1988), an Italian sculptor
 Tazio Nuvolari (1892–1953), nicknamed Nivola, an Italian racing driver
 Nivola Museum, a museum in Italy dedicated to Costantino Nivola